= Vārnukrogs =

Neighbourhood of Jurmala, Latvia

Coordinates: 57°00′N 23°57′E

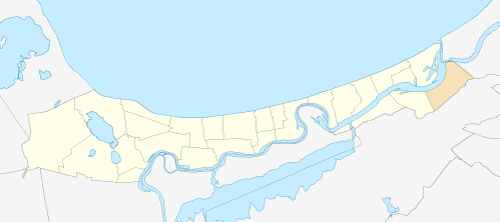
- Location in Jūrmala
- Country: Latvia
- City: Jūrmala

Area
  - Total: 5.0 km^{2} (1.9 sq mi)
- Elevation: 5 m (16 ft)

Population (2008)
  - Total: 138
  - Density: 27.6/km^{2} (71/sq mi)
- Pasta indekss: LV-2010 Bulduri

Vārnukrogs is a residential area and neighbourhood of the city Jūrmala, Latvia.
